Marieholm is a locality situated in Eslöv Municipality, Skåne County, Sweden with 1,655 inhabitants as of 2018.

References 

Populated places in Eslöv Municipality
Populated places in Skåne County